The 2008 edition of the J. League Cup, officially the 2008 J.League Yamazaki Nabisco Cup, sponsored by Nabisco began on March 20. The top team in each of the four qualifying group automatically qualified for the quarter finals along with the best two remaining runners-up. Both Gamba Osaka and Kashima Antlers received a bye to the quarter-final stage due to their participation in the group stage of the Asian Champions League.

Oita Trinita defeated Shimizu S-Pulse 2–0 in the final on November 1 at the Tokyo National Stadium. They qualified for the 2009 Pan-Pacific Championship and the 2009 Suruga Bank Championship.

Group stage

Group A

Group B

Group C

Group D

Knockout stage

Quarter-finals

First leg

Second leg

Gamba Osaka advances to the semi finals on Away goals rule.

Semifinals

First leg

Second leg

Final

Awards
 MVP:  Daiki Takamatsu (Oita Trinita)
 Top Scorer:  Keita Sugimoto (Nagoya Grampus) 
 New Hero Prize:  Mu Kanazaki (Oita Trinita)

External links
 J.League Official Site 

2008
J League Cup, 2008
J League Cup, 2008